Jonny Sweet (born 1985) is a British comedian and the recipient of the 2009 Edinburgh Comedy Award for best newcomer.

Early life
Sweet was born in Nottingham and educated at the local independent school Nottingham High School. He read English at Pembroke College, Cambridge and met writing partner Joe Thomas, and both were members of the Footlights. Sweet served as vice-president to Simon Bird while Thomas was secretary. After graduating, the three shared a flat together before their big break into comedy and television. He graduated with a first and was expected to follow his father into the legal profession but joined Endemol UK on an internship instead.
He is a supporter of Nottingham Forest Football Club.

Career
In 2009 Sweet won The Edinburgh Comedy Award for best newcomer for his show 'Mostly About Arthur'. He also starred in Tom Basden's debut play Party alongside Basden himself, 2009 Edinburgh Comedy Award winner Tim Key, Anna Crilly, Katy Wix and Nick Mohammed. The play won a Fringe First before travelling to the Sydney Arts Festival and appearing in London's West End and in adaptation as a BBC Radio 4 sitcom.

Sweet became known for playing posh characters after his role as future Prime Minister David Cameron in the 2009 More 4 satirical show When Boris Met Dave, which details how Cameron and Mayor of London Boris Johnson first met. He also appeared alongside Alistair McGowan, Adrian Edmonson and Hugh Dennis in Pete and Dud: The Lost Sketches, a revival of Peter Cook and Dudley Moore's works on BBC Two.

In 2012, he had a small role in BBC's Him & Her as one of Paul's newly found relatives.

He is also writing partner with Inbetweeners stars Simon Bird and Joe Thomas and together they make up the sketch group The House of Windsor. Following their critically acclaimed Edinburgh show The Meeting, they are now developing projects together for TV and film. Their period sitcom Chickens, about 3 conscientious objectors during World War I was broadcast in Autumn on Sky One, also starring Barry Humphries. Thomas and Sweet have also performed as a double-act, garnering many rave reviews and being nominated for a Writer's Guild Award.

He has recorded two series of his Radio 4 sitcom, Hard to Tell, a romance, starring Charlotte Ritchie as his love interest. The structure mainly consists of conversation between Tom (Sweet) and his sister Maeve (Katy Wix) telling his side of the developing romance, and between Ellen (Ritchie) and best friend Hermione (Sarah Solomani). In 2013, he was nominated for the Best Breakthrough Artist at the British Comedy Awards.

In 2014 Sweet starred as Tom Oliver in the Channel 4 police comedy-drama series Babylon. In 2015, Sweet created, wrote and starred in the BBC sitcom Together based loosely on his radio series Hard to Tell. He also wrote an episode of Tom Basden's E4 series Gap Year.

In mid-2017 Sweet starred in the sitcom Loaded (Channel 4), about a group of IT entrepreneurs who become millionaires when their company is bought out.

Filmography

Film

TV series

Writing credits

References

External links

Alumni of Pembroke College, Cambridge
British comedians
1985 births
Living people
People educated at Nottingham High School